This is a list of launches made by the Scout rocket.

Launches By Vehicle

Launches By Decade

Launch History

| colspan="6" |

1960

|-

| colspan="6" |

1961

|-

| colspan="6" |

1962

|-

| colspan="6" |

1963

|-

| colspan="6" |

1964

|-

| colspan="6" |

1965

|-

| colspan="6" |

1966

|-

| colspan="6" |

1967

|-

| colspan="6" |

1968

|-

| colspan="6" |

1969

|-

| colspan="6" |

1970

|-

| colspan="6" |

1971

|-

| colspan="6" |

1972

|-

| colspan="6" |

1973

|-

| colspan="6" |

1974

|-

| colspan="6" |

1975

|-

| colspan="6" |

1976

|-

| colspan="6" |

1977

|-

| colspan="6" |

1978

|-

| colspan="6" |

1979

|-

| colspan="6" |

1980

|-
| colspan="6" |

1981

|-

| colspan="6" |

1982

|-
| colspan="6" |

1983

|-

| colspan="6" |

1984

|-

| colspan="6" |

1985

|-

| colspan="6" |

1986

|-

| colspan="6" |

1987

|-

| colspan="6" |

1988

|-

| colspan="6" |

1989

|-
| colspan="6" |

1990

|-

| colspan="6" |

1991

|-

| colspan="6" |

1992

|-

| colspan="6" |

1993

|-

| colspan="6" |

1994

|-

| colspan="6" |
|}

References

 
 
 

Scout